William Gallier (24 April 1932 – 6 February 2011) was an English footballer and manager, who played for Walsall, Tamworth and Hednesford Town during his career, before going on to manage Armitage.

References

1932 births
2011 deaths
People from Cannock
English footballers
Association football utility players
Walsall F.C. players
Tamworth F.C. players
Hednesford Town F.C. players
English football managers